Jeremy Barlow (born August 11, 1985) is an American soccer player who most recently played for Richmond Kickers in the USL Second Division.

Career

Youth and college
Barlow grew up in Herndon, Virginia, and attended Langley High School, where he was named the Liberty District Player of the Year and was selected to the All-Region and All-Journal teams. He played club soccer for Reston FC and D.C. United Youth, before going on to play four years of college soccer at the University of Virginia. He was named to the 2004 ACC Tournament MVP, and was selected to the 2004 ACC All-Tournament Team and the 2004 ACC All-Freshman Team in his debut year, and went on to be a Second Team VaSID All-State selection as a sophomore. He totaled seven goals and an assist in his freshman year, added two goals and nine assists during his sophomore campaign and two goals and two assists in his junior year before finishing his collegiate career with a goal and six assists last fall.

During his college years Barlow also played in the USL Premier Development League for Richmond Kickers Future, before turning professional in 2008.

Professional
Barlow was selected in the fourth round (56th overall) of the 2008 MLS SuperDraft by Houston Dynamo. His contract rights were subsequently transferred from Houston to D.C. United, where he signed a developmental contract. He went on to feature in eight reserve games for D.C. in 2008, but was released in August of that year without having seen first team action. He was later picked up by Los Angeles Galaxy on waivers, but again never made a first team appearance for the club, and was released during the 2009 MLS pre-season.

Barlow moved to Europe in the spring of 2009 in search playing time, and subsequently signed with Pallo-Iirot of the Kakkonen, the third tier of Finnish football. He returned to the United States in the summer of 2010 when he signed with the Richmond Kickers of the USL Second Division. He made his first appearance for the team on July 31, 2010 in 2-0 win over the Harrisburg City Islanders, and went on to feature in three league games for the Kickers during the season. He was not re-signed by the Kickers for the 2011 season.

References

External links
 Virginia bio

1985 births
Living people
American soccer players
Association football forwards
D.C. United players
Houston Dynamo FC draft picks
LA Galaxy players
Richmond Kickers players
Richmond Kickers Future players
People from Herndon, Virginia
Soccer players from Virginia
Sportspeople from Fairfax County, Virginia
USL League Two players
USL Second Division players
Virginia Cavaliers men's soccer players